A timeline of notable events relating to Magic 105.4, a commercial radio station operated by Bauer Radio, and the former Magic Network broadcast on AM stations in the north of England.

1990s
 1990
9 July – Melody Radio launches as an easy listening music service in London.
17 July – Magic 828 launches as a MW oldies station in Leeds.
 1997
February – Emap launches a network of Magic stations on its MW frequencies across the north of England. Playing soft adult contemporary music, they replace regional oldies stations Great North Radio and Great Yorkshire Gold. Magic 1161 and Magic 990, 1305 & 1548 launch on the 12th, followed one week later by the north east stations Magic 1152 and Magic 1170
17 March – The Magic brand is rolled out across the north west.
 1998
 June – Emap purchases Melody 105.4 FM. 
December – Melody Radio is renamed Magic 105.4 FM.
 1999
No events.

2000s
 2000
No events.
 2001
13 September – Magic launches a spin-off television channel.
December – EMAP decides that it is more economical for north of England Magic stations to share off-peak programmes and begins networking with the London station Magic 105.4 between 10am-2pm, and 7pm-6am, although there are local commercial breaks, and local news on the hour. During these hours the station is simply known as Magic.
2002
No events.
2003
January – Due to a sharp decline in listening, Emap ends the networking of London station Magic 105.4 on the north of England Magic stations and a regional northern network is created with programmes broadcast from Magic 1152 in Newcastle. During networked hours, local adverts are aired, as well as local news on the hour.
September – 
Live evening programmes on Magic 105.4 are replaced by automated output. 
Richard Skinner leaves for a while. He had been mid-morning presenter for Magic since 1997.
2004
No events.
2005
12 September – Neil Fox joins Magic 105.4 as the station's breakfast presenter.
 2006
July – The Magic AM network is revamped to appeal to an older audience. The changes see the introduction of more networking  with only the 4 hour breakfast show remaining local. As part of the revamp, Dave Lee Travis and Eamonn Holmes join the station to present weekend shows.
 2007
September – After a year with the station, Graham Dene leaves Magic 105.4. He is replaced as drivetime host by Steve Priestley.
 2008
 29 January – Bauer completes the purchase of EMAPs radio, television and consumer media businesses, purchasing the assets for £1.14bn.
 September – Singer Kim Wilde joins the station to present a Sunday lunchtime show.
2009
Steve Priestley leaves.

2010s
2010
9 January – Boyzone singer Ronan Keating joins the station to present a Sunday afternoon show.
2011
No events.
2012
23 March – Tony Blackburn and Mike Read are signed to appear on Magic Network.
April – The weekend breakfast show on the north of England Magic Network stations stops being a local show and is replaced by a networked programme. Consequently, only the weekday breakfast show remains locally produced.
16 November – Magic Network presenter Dave Lee Travis is taken off air with immediate effect after he was arrested as part of an investigation into sexual offences.
2013
15 April – Bauer increases networking on its Yorkshire Magic stations with a networked breakfast show coming from Magic 828 in Leeds. The other local Magic breakfast shows become regional programmes at around the same time.
August – Richard Skinner rejoins the station to provide cover for holidaying presenters. He continues in this role throughout 2014.
2014
30 September – Neil Fox presents Magic 105.4's breakfast show for the final time. since Fox was arrested at the Magic 105.4 Studios on sex assault charges.
27 October – Richard Allinson joins Magic 105.4 to present the drivetime show.
2015
5 January – 
Magic 105.4 launches nationally on Digital One.
The north of England Magic Network stations are rebranded as Bauer City 2.
January–March – Christine Bleakley presents an hour-long Sunday afternoon programme called Sunday Lunch.
2016
Lynn Parsons joins.
15 March – Mellow Magic begins broadcasting, and Fran Godfrey joins. 
28 March – Magic Chilled begins broadcasting.
16 April – Mel Giedroyc joins the station to present the Saturday lunchtime show.
Spring – Magic broadcasts a temporary pop-up service called Magic ABBA, run as a commercial partnership with Mamma Mia!: the Musical
Following the ending of Magic Abba, ‘’Magic Summer Soul’’ is launched. Initially intended as another short-term pop-up, the station becomes permanent in the autumn and is renamed Magic Soul. 
October – Tom Price joins the station to present the weekend afternoon show, replacing Martin Collins who leaves after seven years of broadcasting at Magic 105.4.
2017
Alan Dedicoat joins Mellow Magic
April – The station sound is repositioned to play more 80s and 90s along with a new tag line "More of the songs you love."
September – Ronan Keating and Harriet Scott become co-presenters of the breakfast show. Other changes see Tom Price replaces Harriet as weekend breakfast presenter and Matt Brown take over weekend afternoons.
2018
30 November – The station flips to a format of 100% Christmas music. Previously, its sister station Magic Soul would change to a Christmas music only playlist but this year its main station flipped. This is the first time a major UK radio station has done so. Bauer says listeners can expect "festive editorial content and a selection of much-loved Christmas pop hits from the last fifty years".
2019
21 November – Bauer launches Magic at the Musicals on DAB+ in and around London. Presenters include Ruthie Henshall and Jonathan Bailey.

2020s
2020
31 August – Magic Radio begins broadcasting on MW in East Yorkshire, Hull and North Lincolnshire.
2021
30 April – Magic Radio stops broadcasting on MW across East Yorkshire and North Lincolnshire following the switching off of the Goxhill transmitter.

References

Magic